Strapping refers to the use of a strap as an implement of corporal punishment. It is typically a broad and heavy strip of leather, often with a hard handle, the more flexible 'blade' being applied to the offender.

Probably because of the stiffness, the word "strap" is sometimes used interchangeably with a leather paddle. Other terms that are used interchangeably include whipping, lashing, and belting.

The Scottish tawse is a forked version with two or more tails, colloquially known as the belt, and was the standard implement of punishment in state schools until it was banned in 1987.

 The historical strap, usually made for institutional use, is also known as a prison strap when used on adult convicts – either for discipline within the prison system, or as an original judicial corporal punishment, often combined with prison time, imposed by a court but carried out by prison staff. This has been the case notably in the USA (mainly the South, e.g. Arkansas at least until 1967; sometimes a spanking inflicted on the trousers, sometimes bare bottom but also used on the back) and Canada (until 1972, delivered to the offender's bare buttocks).

The strap has also been used on minors in reformatories and in schools. The latter was particularly prevalent in Canada, applied to the student's hand, until the practice was abolished in 2004, but there, in modern times at least, it was generally made of canvas/rubber rather than leather.

 Because of the forceful impact a disciplinary strap makes, which can easily knock the recipient out of balance and make him or her fall over (reported by strapped punishees who were ordered to receive it while grabbing their ankles), the victim is usually supported in a bending or lying position, sometimes tied down, e.g. over a table or punishment horse, or against a whipping post.
 Like the holed paddle, there is a version of the strap with holes. It intentionally increases the risk and severity of blistering if administered on the bare skin.

Martin Tabert, a 22-year-old man arrested for vagrancy, died after being hit about 100 times with a 5-foot leather strap in 1921. The strapping was punishment for Tabert failing to perform his work as part of a prison work-gang in Leon County, Florida. He was weak with malaria at the time. Sheriff J. R. Jones had "sold" the man to the head of the work-gang for a twenty-five dollar fee. Cavalier County (North Dakota) States Attorney Gudmunder Grimson and New York World reporter Samuel "Duff" McCoy brought the case to national attention. The World won the 1924 Pulitzer Prize for Public Service for its coverage of the incident. A ballad by Marjory Stoneman Douglas memorialized the case. The whipping-boss, Walter Higginbotham, was charged with Tabert's murder but acquitted. Florida's then governor Cary Hardee outlawed the use of flogging in the wake of public outrage over the death, and brought an end to the convict lease system in the state.

See also

 Caning

References

Corporal punishments
Spanking